Stephanie Bennett is a Canadian actress. She is known for her roles in the film Leprechaun: Origins (2014) and the series Shadowhunters (2016–2017).

Career
Bennett portrayed Dee Taggart on the 2015 CBC spy drama The Romeo Section. She also appeared in the 2015 Disney Channel television film Descendants as Snow White. Her other acting credits include the films Grave Encounters 2 and Leprechaun: Origins, and appearances on television series Supernatural and iZombie. She appeared as Lydia Branwell in the Freeform fantasy television series Shadowhunters from 2016–2017.

In September 2016, CBC announced it had commissioned a one-hour drama series that follows the star players of an under-21 soccer academy in Montreal, titled 21 Thunder, with Bennett cast as one of the three lead characters. The series premiered on July 31, 2017 in Canada to positive reviews. In 2017, Bennett played the role of Jenny in Season 2 of the Showcase/Netflix sci-fi series Travelers.

Filmography

Awards and nominations

References

External links
 

Year of birth missing (living people)
21st-century Canadian actresses
Actresses from Vancouver
Canadian film actresses
Canadian television actresses
Living people